Season six of the television program American Experience originally aired on the PBS network in the United States on October 27, 1993 and concluded on May 25, 1994. This is the sixth season to feature David McCullough as the host. The season contained eight new episodes and began with the film Amelia Earhart: The Price of Courage.

Episodes

 Denotes multiple chapters that aired on the same date and share the same episode number

References

1993 American television seasons
1994 American television seasons
American Experience